Rick Becker is an American politician from Bismarck. He serves in the North Dakota House of Representatives as an Independent, having been elected as a Republican.

Becker is a plastic surgeon and businessman with several commercial developments. He was elected to represent District 7 in the North Dakota House in 2012, and was reelected to a four-year term in 2014. Becker has often been cited as among the top fiscal conservatives in the House. He was a candidate for Governor of North Dakota in the 2016 gubernatorial election. He considered running in the run for the US Senate against incumbent Heidi Heitkamp, but ultimately decided against a run, and is instead planning to run for reelection to the State House. Becker has also held a position on the Bismarck Planning and Zoning Commission.

Becker was an independent candidate in the 2022 United States Senate election in North Dakota, after unsuccessfully challenging incumbent John Hoeven in the Republican primary. He placed a strong third in the general election, having received 18.5% of the vote.

Political views 
Becker is often described as a conservative or libertarian. He has described himself as "...many things: a classical liberal, libertarian, fiscal conservative, laissez-faire capitalist. There are many things that you can refer to me as." Becker has voluntarily requested officials to rescind certain benefits and tax breaks his businesses are eligible for because he doesn't agree with them. In an interview, Becker stated, "I'm a very vocal opponent to most government incentive programs. I'm very much a believer in the free market." In 2017, he said that North Dakota has too many colleges, saying the state board of higher education should look into "re-purposing some of the campuses."

63rd legislative session
During his first session in 2013, Becker gained notoriety for being a staunch fiscal hawk and civil libertarian. He formed the ultraconservative Bastiat Caucus, named after the political philosopher Frédéric Bastiat. Eventually, the group grew to several dozen members of the North Dakota House, often holding regular meetings to organize a unified, conservative front on key votes.

64th legislative session
During the 2015 legislative session, Becker supported Division A of HB 1461, which would have pulled North Dakota out of the Smarter Balanced Assessment Consortium, generally seen as a move to get the state out of the Common Core standards. The bill narrowly failed. Becker was the main force courting support for the bill, which Governor Jack Dalrymple, state Superintendent of Public Instruction Kirsten Baesler, and Republican Party leadership opposed.

Becker supported a bill that would have brought the state income tax down to a 0% rate for an extended tax holiday for residents paying those taxes. His bill to ban DUI checkpoints garnered significant controversy but ultimately failed.

65th legislative session

In 2017, Becker and others decided to provide a more organized, public presence for their Bastiat Caucus in order to disseminate information to the public about key legislation from Caucus members. This effort included an aggressive social media campaign, website and grassroots organizing headed by his former gubernatorial campaign staff. Some in the media reported division amongst the ranks of the Republican Party and efforts by leadership to thwart Becker's legislative initiatives.

Becker introduced 17 bills during the 2017 legislative session, more than most representatives. His "constitutional carry" bill, which would allow otherwise law-abiding citizens to carry concealed weapons without a permit generated significant interest and attention. He also introduced legislation on free speech protections on college campuses that would eliminate "safe spaces" and a bill decriminalizing marijuana. In the aftermath of the 2015 legislative battle over getting out of Common Core in North Dakota and an electoral challenge to Superintendent of Public Instruction, Kirsten Baesler, Becker decided to put forward legislation to provide school choice in North Dakota. His bill, which would establish education savings accounts, was introduced.

2016 gubernatorial campaign

On November 11, 2015, in an online video announcement, Becker became the first candidate to announce his candidacy in the 2016 gubernatorial election. The campaign sought the endorsement of the Republican Party at its state convention, held in Fargo in April 2016. He publicly pledged to not proceed past the convention without support from the Party. Becker was endorsed by many of the top conservatives in the legislature, including Majority Caucus Leader Scott Louser. He was also endorsed by the National Association for Gun Rights and by Congressman and former presidential candidate Ron Paul.

At the State Republican Convention, Becker came in second to Attorney General Wayne Stenehjem on a first and second ballot. Eventually, Stenehjem won in a close race over Becker. Doug Burgum, who came in a distant third at the convention, eventually defeated Stenehjem in the June 14 Republican primary.

Despite losing the Republican gubernatorial endorsement, Becker received more votes as a delegate to the Republican National Convention than anyone else, including the sitting Governor Jack Dalrymple and Senator John Hoeven.

2018 U.S. Senate election

Becker was seen as a potential candidate for the U.S. Senate race in 2018 against incumbent Democrat Heidi Heitkamp. There were strong expectations he would shore up support from the Party's more conservative and libertarian grassroots.

Becker spent some of the spring and summer of 2017 preparing for a possible Senate run. In April, he traveled to Washington, D.C. to meet with various groups and elected officials. On July 6, he announced on Facebook that he would be speaking across the state. On August 2, speaking before Fargo Republicans, he urged the party to do a better job of staying true to its "conservative roots". Congressman Kevin Cramer was widely considered the top prospective candidate, but Becker stated his decision to run would not be based upon Cramer's decision.

On January 2, Becker announced on Facebook that he would not enter the race. Instead, he announced his plans to seek reelection to the state house, stating, "I know I can make a difference in North Dakota, and I am worried about giving up such an important opportunity and responsibility".

2022 U.S. Senate campaign

On January 19, 2022, Becker announced he would not run for reelection to the North Dakota House of Representatives. On February 6, he announced he would primary incumbent U.S. Senator John Hoeven in the 2022 election. Becker was defeated by Hoeven at the GOP convention on April 2, by a vote of 1,224 (54%) to 1,037 (46%). Although Becker pledged at the convention to honor their decision, he subsequently changed his mind and re-entered the race as a conservative Independent candidate in August.

Electoral history
 2012 Race for North Dakota's House of Representatives – District 07
Voters to choose two:
{| class="wikitable"
|-
!Name
!Votes
!Percent
!Outcome
|-
|-
|Jason D. Dockter, (R).
|4,374
|  33.2%
|   Won
|-
|-
|Rick Becker, (R).
|4,291
|  32.6%
|   Won
|-
|-
|Tom Kelsh, (D).
|2,351
|  17.8%
|   Lost
|-
|-
|Warren D. Larson, (D).
|2,143
|  16.4%
|   Lost
|-
|}
 2014 Race for North Dakota's House of Representatives – District 07
Voters to choose two:
{| class="wikitable"
|-
!Name
!Votes
!Percent
!Outcome
|-
|-
|Jason D. Dockter, (R).
|4,624
|  49.6%
|   Won
|-
|-
|Rick Becker, (R).
|4,569
|  49.0%
|   Won
|-
|Write-ins
|125
|  1.%
|   Lost
|-
|}

2016 North Dakota Republican State Convention
 First Convention Ballot
Delegates to choose one, all candidates remain on ballot after first round, starting third round of voting, lowest vote-getter would be removed, first candidate to receive 50%+1 wins:
{| class="wikitable"
|-
!Name
!Votes
!Percent
!Outcome
|-
|-
|Wayne Stenehjem
|769
|  48.0
|   proceeded to 2nd ballot
|-
|-
|Rick Becker
|587
|  36.6%
|   proceeded to 2nd ballot
|-
|-
|Doug Burgum
|247
|  15.4%
|   proceeded to 2nd ballot
|-
|}
 Second Convention Ballot
{| class="wikitable"
|-
!Name
!Votes
!Percent
!Outcome
|-
|-
|Wayne Stenehjem
|823
|  51.5%
|   received NDGOP endorsement
|-
|-
|Rick Becker
|618
|  38.7%
|   withdrew
|-
|-
|Doug Burgum
|157
|  9.8%
|   proceeded to Republican primary ballot
|-
|}

References

External links
 

21st-century American politicians
American plastic surgeons
Candidates in the 2022 United States Senate elections
Living people
Republican Party members of the North Dakota House of Representatives
Place of birth missing (living people)
Politicians from Bismarck, North Dakota
University of North Dakota alumni
Year of birth missing (living people)